Stories and Songs may refer to:

 Stories & Songs (Mark Schultz album), 2003
 Stories & Songs (Jimmy Ibbotson album), 2000
 Stories and Songs (Franciscus Henri album), 1994
 Stories and Songs: The Adventures of Captain Feathersword the Friendly Pirate, a 1993 album from The Wiggles

See also 
 Songs & Stories, a 1991 LP by Dance House Children